Charles Yon (June 16, 1876 – October 1937) was an American football player and coach. He served as the head football coach at Susquehanna University from in 1902.

References

External links
 

1876 births
1937 deaths
Susquehanna River Hawks football coaches
Susquehanna University alumni
People from Blair County, Pennsylvania